Imogen Skirving (1937 – 1 July 2016) was a British hotelier, who turned her family home Langar Hall into an award-winning country house hotel.

Guests at Langar Hall included Keira Knightley and the Archbishop of Canterbury, and former Labour leader Ed Miliband was married there.

She died on 1 July 2016, when she was hit by a car whilst on holiday in Menorca. Her father, Geoffrey Huskinson Sr., was a first-class cricketer, while her brother, Geoffrey Huskinson Jr. was a prominent cartoonist.

References

1937 births
2016 deaths
People from Rushcliffe (district)
20th-century English businesswomen
20th-century English businesspeople
21st-century English businesswomen
21st-century English businesspeople
British hoteliers
Road incident deaths in Spain
British expatriates in Spain
Women hoteliers